The opening ceremony of the 1988 Summer Olympics took place at Seoul Olympic Stadium in Seoul, South Korea, on 17 September 1988 at 10:30 KDT (UTC+10). The official song of this game was Hand in Hand, which was performed by Koreana. The Games were officially opened by President of the Republic of Korea Roh Tae-woo.

Ceremony

Opening 
The ceremony was the last one at which doves were released. Since 1920, doves had been released at Olympic opening ceremonies. However, in Seoul many of the doves landed in the cauldron. When Olympic Torch bearer Sohn Kee-chung approached, some of the doves did not leave the cauldron and were burnt alive when the Olympic Flame was lit. The outcry meant that at future games, the doves were represented by inanimate objects or human actors.

Parade of Nations 

The flag bearers of 160 National Olympic Committees entered the stadium, ordered by the Korean alphabet, and behind them marched the athletes.

It was also the last parade that involves East Germany, Soviet Union, West Germany and Yugoslavia, and the only parade of South Yemen, which were ceased to exist a few years later.

Opening
SLOOC President Park Seh-jik delivered a speech in Korean, welcoming everyone. IOC President Juan Antonio Samaranch delivered a speech in English and French.
South Korean President Roh Tae-woo declared the Games of the XXIV Olympiad in Seoul opened in Korean.

Anthems
 Olympic Hymn
 National Anthem of South Korea

Dignitaries in attendance
Most countries were represented by governmental-level representatives, and only a few world leaders came to the ceremony.

International organizations:
  United Nations - Secretary General Javier Perez de Cuellar
  International Olympic Committee - President of the International Olympic Committee Juan Antonio Samaranch, former president Lord Killanin and members of the IOC

Host nation :
  South Korea - President of the Seoul Olympic Organizing Committee Park Seh-jik, President of the Republic of Korea Roh Tae-woo, First Lady of the Republic of Korea Kim Ok-suk, Prime Minister Lee Hyun-jae, National Assembly member Kim Dae-jung, Lee Hee-ho, President of Democratic Reunification Kim Young-sam, Son Myung-soon and other prominent South Korean politicians

Foreign dignitaries :
  Thailand - Vice Prime Minister Tienchai Sirisamphan, Miss Universe 1988 Porntip Nakhirunkanok
  Japan - Prime Minister of Japan Noboru Takeshita and wife Noko Takeshita
  China - Second Vice Premier of China Tian Jiyun
  Spain - Crown Prince Felipe and Queen Sofia of Spain
  West Germany - First Mayor of Hamburg Henning Voscherau
  Denmark - Crown Prince Frederick
  France - Foreign Minister Roland Dumas
  Italy - Deputy Prime Minister Gianni De Michelis
  Greece - Former King of Greece Constantine II
  Luxembourg - Jean, Grand Duke of Luxembourg
  Monaco - Prince of Monaco Rainier III
  United States - Mayor of Los Angeles Thomas Bradley
  Canada - Mayor of Calgary Don Hartman
  Iran - Vice President Ahmad Dargahi
  Gambia - Vice President Bakary Darbo, Foreign Minister Sey.O
  United Kingdom - Minister for Sport Colin Moynihan, 4th Baron Moynihan
  Norway - Crown Prince Harald and Prince Haakon of Norway
  Sweden - King Carl XVI Gustaf
  Switzerland - Vice President Jean-Pascal Delamuraz
  Malaysia - Azlan Shah of Perak
  Brunei - Prince Sufri Bolkiah

TV coverage

References

Bibliography

opening ceremony
Ceremonies in South Korea
Olympics opening ceremonies